That's the Spirit may refer to:

That's the Spirit (1924 film), an American film with Neely Edwards
That's the Spirit (1933 film), an American short film featuring song, dance, and music performances
That's the Spirit (1945 film), an American comedy film
That's the Spirit, the fifth studio album by British rock band Bring Me the Horizon